Podolepis decipiens, commonly known as deceiving copperwire-daisy, is a flowering plant in the family Asteraceae and grows in Victoria, Tasmania and New South Wales. It is an upright, perennial herb with yellow daisy-like flowers on a single stem rising from a sparse rosette.

Description

Taxonomy and naming
Podolepis decipiens was first formally described in 2015 by Jeffrey A. Jeanes and the description was published in Muelleria. The specific epithet (decipiens) means "deceiving" because in has been confused with Podolepis jaceoides.

Distribuiton and habitat
Deceiving copper wire-daisy is a widespread species found in a variety of habitats including grasslands, woodlands, forests, alpine and near coastal locations in New South Wales, Victoria, Tasmania, South Australia and Queensland.

References

decipiens
Flora of New South Wales
Flora of Tasmania
Flora of Victoria (Australia)
Flora of South Australia
Flora of Queensland
Plants described in 2015
Flora of the Australian Capital Territory